Toni Chishi (born 11 September 1995) is an Indian cricketer. He made his List A debut for Nagaland in the 2018–19 Vijay Hazare Trophy on 23 September 2018. He made his first-class debut for Nagaland in the 2018–19 Ranji Trophy on 30 December 2018. He made his Twenty20 debut for Nagaland in the 2018–19 Syed Mushtaq Ali Trophy on 25 February 2019.

References

External links
 

1995 births
Living people
Indian cricketers
Nagaland cricketers
Place of birth missing (living people)